Balina is a surname. People with that name include:

 Aloysius Balina (1945–2012), Tanzanian Roman Catholic bishop
 Theodore Balina, Ottoman Bulgarian nobleman

See also
 Acraea balina, junior synonym of Acraea uvui, a species of butterfly
 Balina Guri, a 1979 Indian Kannada film
 Balinas, a surname
 Ballina (disambiguation)
 Exercise Mavi Balina, an international anti submarine warfare exercise led by Turkish Naval Forces (2016)